TLM full form may refer to: 

 Traditional Latin Mass, also known as Tridentine Mass 

 Taichung Literature Museum, a museum in Taichung, Taiwan
 Télé Lyon Métropole, TV Channel of Lyon's agglomeration
 The Leprosy Mission
 The Little Mermaid
 The Loom Merchant
 Thetis Lake Monster
 Transaction-level modeling
 Transmission-line matrix method
 Transmission line measurement
 Transmission line modelling
 The ICAO airline code for Thai Lion Air
 The Indian Railways station code for Tirusulam railway station, Chennai, Tamil Nadu, India
 Teaching/Learning Materials, also known as Instructional materials
 Tech Lead Manager, in technology companies, a "tech lead" (also known as a lead programmer) or team leader who also has some number of direct reports, as a more traditional manager would.